Live House is a 2009 documentary film directed by Kevin Mcgue. The film includes interviews with Minutemen founder Mike Watt, Red Bacteria Vacuum, and other Japanese underground bands.

The documentary explores the underground rock music scene in Japan, in which bands play at venues called "live houses," which differ from live music venues in other countries. According to live house owners and bands interviewed in the film, a live house is different from bars in America that invite bands to play and charge a cover, as customers at a live house come primarily to enjoy music rather than drink alcohol.

Mike Watt, interviewed for the film during a tour of Japan, talks of first coming to Japan when playing bass for J. Mascis and Iggy Pop during stadium tours, but became interested in the country's underground music scene and returning to tour in much smaller venues.

References

External links
 
 Live House official website

2009 documentary films
2009 films
Rockumentaries
Films shot in Tokyo
Japanese documentary films
2000s Japanese-language films
2000s Japanese films